The 2015 Jalisco Open was a professional tennis tournament played on hard courts. It was the fifth edition of the tournament which was part of the 2015 ATP Challenger Tour. It took place in Guadalajara, Mexico between 20 and 26 April 2015.

Singles main-draw entrants

Seeds

 1 Rankings are as of April 13, 2015.

Other entrants
The following players received wildcards into the singles main draw:
  César Ramírez
  Daniel Garza
  Miguel Ángel Reyes-Varela
  Lucas Gómez

The following players received entry from the qualifying draw:
  Henrique Cunha
  Kevin King 
  Luis Patiño
  Mauricio Echazu

Champions

Singles

 Rajeev Ram def.  Jason Jung, 6–1, 6–2

Doubles

 Austin Krajicek /  Rajeev Ram def.  Marcelo Demoliner /  Miguel Ángel Reyes-Varela, 7–5, 4–6, [10–6]

External links
Official Website 

Jalisco Open
Jalisco Open
2015 in Mexican tennis